Fjalar may refer to:

 Fjalar and Galar, dwarf brothers in Norse mythology who killed the god Kvasir and turned his blood into the mead of poetry
Fjalar, the mythical red rooster that will herald the beginning of Ragnarök in Norse mythology
 The name of Rusky's horse in The Brothers Lionheart
 Fjalar Þorgeirsson (born 1977), Icelandic footballer
 Fjalar Finnäs (born 1953), Finnish professor of demographics
 King Fjalar, a character in book Kung Fjalar (1844) written by Finnish Johan Ludvig Runeberg